A Festhalle is a German arena or community center. The root meaning of the name "Fest-halle" literally means "Feast-Hall," but is best translated as "Festival Hall" or "Civic Center." Festhalles can be found in many towns and cities in Germany, and range in size and use from small neighborhood activity centers, to large capacity stadiums able to seat thousands of spectators. Some of the best known Festhalle in Germany are as follows:

 Berlin
 The Festhalle Plauen
 Seating ~ 4,820
 Stuttgart
 Seating ~ 18,000
 Dresden
 Arena Dresden
 Seating ~ 13,000
 Frankfurt
 Festhalle Frankfurt
 Seating ~ 15,179
 Munich
 The Löwenbräu-Festhalle
 Seating ~ 5,700

Frankfurt Festhalle 

The Festhalle in Frankfurt, Germany is used primarily for indoor sports and music concerts. Frankfurt's Festhalle has a capacity of 15,179 people. On October 9, 2004 World Wrestling Entertainment (WWE) hosted a live event in the Festhalle as a part of the "Live & Loaded" Tour. WWE is scheduled to come back to this German show venue on December 6, 2007, with a house show from their SmackDown! brand.  Canadian prog-rock trio Rush recorded their R30: 30th Anniversary World Tour DVD there on September 24, 2004.
In November 2008, British hard rock band Deep Purple had a concert in Festhalle during the band's 40 years anniversary tour.

External links
Homepage of the Berlin Festhalle Plauen 
Homepage of the Dresden Festhalle
Homepage of the Frankfurt Festhalle
Homepage of the Munich Löwenbräu-Festhalle

Indoor arenas in Germany

de:Festhalle
es:Festhalle